The Flaming Lips and Stardeath and White Dwarfs with Henry Rollins and Peaches Doing The Dark Side of the Moon is a collaborative studio album by the psychedelic rock group the Flaming Lips. The album is a complete track-for-track reimagining of Pink Floyd's seminal 1973 album The Dark Side of the Moon.

The album was released through the iTunes Store on December 22, 2009, and was released on other digital music retailers a week later.

On April 17, 2010, Warner Bros. released 5,000 copies of The Flaming Lips and Stardeath and White Dwarfs with Henry Rollins and Peaches Doing The Dark Side of the Moon on 12" seafoam green vinyl as part of Record Store Day. Upon release the record was released on both seafoam green and clear vinyl with a CD copy of the album included.

Background
The recording's existence was revealed by Flaming Lips' frontman Wayne Coyne before a special promotional concert at the Ricardo Montalbán Theater in Hollywood. The album was recorded with the band Stardeath and White Dwarfs, and features singer Henry Rollins recreating the original album's interview samples. The album also features the singer Peaches who performed Clare Torry's vocal segment of "The Great Gig in the Sky".

Track listing
For writing credits, see the original album's article.  All songs published by World Copyrights Ltd.

Track performances
Track 1 is performed by the Flaming Lips & Stardeath and White Dwarfs featuring Henry Rollins & Peaches.
Tracks 2 and 9 by the Flaming Lips & Stardeath and White Dwarfs featuring Henry Rollins.
Track 3 by Stardeath and White Dwarfs
Track 4 by the Flaming Lips featuring Henry Rollins & Peaches.
Tracks 5 and 6 by the Flaming Lips featuring Henry Rollins.
Track 7 by the Flaming Lips & Stardeath and White Dwarfs.
Track 8 by Stardeath and White Dwarfs featuring Henry Rollins.

Personnel
 Wayne Coyne – vocals, guitar, keyboard
 Michael Ivins – bass, keyboards, backing vocals
 Steven Drozd – guitar, keyboards, bass, drums, vocals
 Kliph Scurlock – drums, percussion
 Dennis Coyne – vocals, guitar, keyboard
 James Young – guitar
 Casey Joseph – bass, keyboard
 Matt Duckworth – drums, percussion
 Henry Rollins – vocals
 Peaches – vocals

Charts

References

2009 albums
Tributes to The Dark Side of the Moon
The Flaming Lips albums
Peaches (musician) albums
Warner Records albums
Collaborative albums
Record Store Day releases
Henry Rollins albums
Stardeath and White Dwarfs albums